Craig Reynolds (born August 11, 1953) is a retired American soccer defender who played professionally in the North American Soccer League and Major Indoor Soccer League.  Most recently Reynolds served as an associate Head Coach with the DePaul University men's soccer from 2011 to 2018.  He also served as an assistant coach with the Chicago Fire from 2004 to 2007. He had three children - Lauren (1988) Taylor (1992) and Aidan (1994).

Player
Reynolds began his collegiate career at Monroe Community College.  He then transferred SUNY Brockport where he played on the 1975 NCAA Men's Division III Soccer Championship team.  He graduated in 1975 with a bachelor's degree in physical education.  In 1976, Reynolds signed with the Rochester Lancers of the North American Soccer League.  He played with the Lancers through the 1980 season when the team folded.  During his years with the Lancers, Reynolds also played indoor soccer during the winter season.  In 1978, he became a member of the New York Arrows of the Major Indoor Soccer League.  The Arrows drew most of its players from the Lancers and were the first champions of M.I.S.L. beating the Philadelphia Fever in the Final in April, 1979. He then moved to the Detroit Lightning for the 1979-1980 MISL season, the Chicago Horizon for the 1980-1981 MISL season and the New Jersey Rockets for the 1981-1982 MISL season.  In 1981, he also played for the Rochester Flash in the American Soccer League.

Coach
In 1985, Reynolds became an assistant coach with the Virginia Cavaliers.  In 1988, he moved to Christopher Newport University where he was head coach of the men's soccer and tennis teams.  During eight seasons, he compiled a 69-66-13 record.  On January 26, 1996, Reynolds became an assistant coach with the Virginia Cavaliers.  In September 2002, he was named the AFLAC Assistant Soccer Coach of the Year.  In 2004, he was hired as an assistant coach by the Chicago Fire of Major League Soccer.  On April 5, 2011, DePaul University hired Reynolds as an assistant coach with the men's soccer team.

References

External links
 NASL/MISL stats
 Virginia Cavaliers coaching bio
 Chicago Fire coaching bio

1953 births
Living people
American soccer coaches
American soccer players
American Soccer League (1933–1983) players
Brockport Golden Eagles men's soccer players
Chicago Horizons players
Christopher Newport Captains
Junior college men's soccer players in the United States
Detroit Lightning players
Hollywood United players
Major Indoor Soccer League (1978–1992) players
Monroe Community College alumni
New Jersey Rockets (MISL) players
New York Arrows players
North American Soccer League (1968–1984) players
Rochester Flash players
Rochester Lancers (1967–1980) players
Virginia Cavaliers men's soccer coaches
DePaul Blue Demons men's soccer coaches
People from Webster, New York
Chicago Fire FC non-playing staff
Association football defenders
College men's soccer coaches in the United States
Soccer players from New York (state)
College tennis coaches in the United States